The 2015 Nordic Futsal Championship was the fifth edition of the Nordic Futsal Championship hosted by Copenhagen, Denmark.

Group stage

Group A

Group B

Final round

5th/6th place match

Third place match

Final

Awards

 Winner:  KaDy Futsal
 Runners-up:  Ilves
 Third-Place:  Göteborg Futsal Club
 Top scorer:
 Best Player:

Final standing

References

External links
 Futsal Planet

2015
2015–16 in European futsal
2015
2015 in Danish sport
2015 in Copenhagen
International sports competitions in Copenhagen